Elitch may refer to:

People:
David Elitch (a.k.a. Dave Elitch), American musician who worked with the American progressive rock band The Mars Volta
John Elitch (1852–1891), restaurateur, businessman, actor, zookeeper, and original owner of Elitch Gardens and the Elitch Theatre
Mary Elitch Long (maiden name Hauck) (1856–1936), one of the original owners of Elitch Gardens in Denver, Colorado 

Colorado:
Elitch Gardens, family-owned seasonal amusement park, theater, and botanic garden in northwest Denver, Colorado, United States
Elitch Gardens Carousel, a 1905 Philadelphia Toboggan Company carousel located in Burlington, Colorado
Elitch Gardens Theme Park, locally known as "Elitch's", an amusement park in Denver, Colorado
Elitch Theatre, located at the original Elitch Gardens site in northwest Denver, Colorado

See also
Delitzsch
Eldritch (disambiguation)
Elic (disambiguation)
Elit (disambiguation)